Denis Alibec (born 5 January 1991) is a Romanian professional footballer who plays as a forward for Liga I club Farul Constanța and the Romania national team.

Alibec began his senior career at Farul Constanța, and at age 18 was signed by Italian club Inter Milan. He only made two Serie A appearances and was loaned out several times, before being brought back to Romania by Astra Giurgiu. He became a regular starter and goalscorer with the latter, and also aided it in winning its first national title in the 2015–16 season. This inspired a move to his former youth team FCSB in 2017, but Alibec transferred back to Astra after only one and a half years. Since 2020, in addition to Romania he has had brief stints in Turkey and Greece.

Internationally, Alibec featured for Romania at under-17, under-19 and under-21 levels, prior to earning his full debut in a 3–0 win over the Faroe Islands in October 2015. The following year, he represented the country in the UEFA Euro 2016.

Club career

Early career
At age ten, after only playing football on the beaches of his native Mangalia, Alibec chose to focus entirely on the sport and joined the youth setup of Callatis Mangalia. He had a brief spell as a junior at Steaua București in 2006, before making his senior debut for Farul Constanța in a 1–1 Liga I draw with Oțelul Galați on 27 September 2008. During the 2008–09 season, he managed to score twice from 18 league matches.

Inter Milan
In July 2009, it was announced that Alibec signed a four-year contract with Italian club Inter Milan. On 19 May 2010, he scored one goal in each half to give Inter a victory over Bayern Munich in the UEFA Under-18 Challenge match, which acted as an inspiration for the UEFA Youth League. 

Alibec registered his Serie A debut on 21 November 2010, coming on as a 68th-minute substitute for Jonathan Biabiany in a 1–2 defeat to Chievo Verona. During that period, he was in rich form in the Campionato Primavera Girone B after scoring eight goals in nine games.

On 24 August 2011, Alibec joined Belgian Pro League side Mechelen on a one-year deal. The next two years, he moved to Viitorul Constanța and Bologna in the same predicament, respectively.

Astra Giurgiu

In January 2014, Romanian club Astra Giurgiu transferred Alibec for an undisclosed fee, with the player penning down a four-and-a-half-year contract. His first goal came in a 2–0 win over Ceahlăul Piatra Neamț, on 30 March 2014. On 6 December that year, he netted in a 6–1 thrashing of Dinamo București.

On 30 April 2015, Alibec scored a 86th-minute volley in a 2–1 win against Petrolul Ploiești, which represented Astra's first Liga I away victory in the Former Ploiești derby. He established himself as one of the league's best players during the 2015–16 campaign, amassing 33 matches and 20 goals in all competitions as manager Marius Șumudică led Astra to its maiden championship title.

On 18 August 2016, Alibec netted the equaliser in a 1–1 Europa League play-off round draw with West Ham United. He went on to make five appearances and score two goals in the group stage of the competition, his notable display throughout 2016 earning him the Gazeta Sporturilor Romanian Footballer of the Year award.

FCSB
On 5 January 2017, Alibec moved to fellow Liga I team FC Steaua București on a five-year deal. The rumoured transfer fee was in the region of €2 million and his buyout clause was set at €20 million. He scored his first competitive goal from the penalty spot in a 1–1 league draw with CFR Cluj on 5 February, in which he was also sent off.

On 2 August 2017, Alibec netted his first European goal for the Roș-albaștrii in a 4–1 Champions League third qualifying round away win over Viktoria Plzeň. After going twelve matches without scoring in the 2017–18 Liga I, Alibec finally found the net in a 2–1 away victory against Gaz Metan Mediaș on 3 February 2018, although his poor performances continued.

Return to Astra Giurgiu
In July 2018, after falling out of favor at the now-renamed FCSB, Alibec returned to Astra Giurgiu in a transfer rumoured to be worth €1.4 million. He managed to regain his form during his spell back at the Marin Anastasovici Stadium, as he scored 22 times from 61 games in all competitions.

Kayserispor

On 2 October 2020, Alibec officially transferred to Turkish team Kayserispor, where he joined compatriots and former Astra teammates Silviu Lung Jr. and Cristian Săpunaru. The day before, Saudi Arabian club Al-Qadsiah had also announced his signing, but the move fell through.

Alibec recorded his first goals in the Süper Lig on 19 January 2021, in a 2–0 victory over defending champions İstanbul Başakşehir. He suffered an injury after the second goal, and as a result he only appeared five more times during the remainder of the season without netting.

On 17 July 2021, Alibec was sent out on a one-year loan to CFR Cluj, with the deal reuniting him with manager Marius Șumudică. The latter was soon replaced by Dan Petrescu, and Alibec began to feature less for the Romanian defending champions. He moved to Super League Greece club Atromitos in the winter transfer window, also on loan until the end of the campaign.

Late career
On 14 July 2022, Alibec returned to Farul Constanța on a free transfer. He signed a one-year contract with the option of another year.

International career

Alibec played youth football for Romania at under-17, under-19 and under-21 levels. On 11 October 2015, after being called up on several occasions in the past, he gained his first cap for the full side in the last UEFA Euro 2016 qualifying match against the Faroe Islands, replacing Bogdan Stancu in the 90th minute of the 3–0 win. 

In June 2016, Alibec was selected by Anghel Iordănescu in his squad for the final tournament in France, and appeared as a substitute in the opening 2–1 defeat to the hosts.

Personal life
Alibec's father and uncle, Gevrim and Gelil, respectively, are of Tatar ethnicity and played football together for roughly ten years at FC Neptun in the third division.

Career statistics

Club

International

Scores and results list Romania's goal tally first, score column indicates score after each Alibec goal.

Honours
Inter Milan 
Supercoppa Italiana: 2010
FIFA Club World Cup: 2010

Astra Giurgiu
Liga I: 2015–16
Cupa României: 2013–14; runner-up: 2018–19
Supercupa României: 2014, 2016

CFR Cluj
Liga I: 2021–22

Individual
Gazeta Sporturilor Romanian Footballer of the Year: 2016
Liga I Team of the Season: 2016–17, 2019–20
DigiSport Liga I Player of the Month: December 2015, April 2016, May 2017

References

External links

1991 births
Living people
People from Mangalia
Romanian people of Crimean Tatar descent
Romanian footballers
Association football forwards
Liga I players
FCV Farul Constanța players
Serie A players
Inter Milan players
Belgian Pro League players
K.V. Mechelen players
FC Viitorul Constanța players
Bologna F.C. 1909 players
FC Astra Giurgiu players
FC Steaua București players
Süper Lig players
Kayserispor footballers
CFR Cluj players
Super League Greece players
Atromitos F.C. players
Romania youth international footballers
Romania under-21 international footballers
Romania international footballers
UEFA Euro 2016 players
Romanian expatriate footballers
Expatriate footballers in Italy
Romanian expatriate sportspeople in Italy
Expatriate footballers in Belgium
Romanian expatriate sportspeople in Belgium
Expatriate footballers in Turkey
Romanian expatriate sportspeople in Turkey
Expatriate footballers in Greece
Romanian expatriate sportspeople in Greece